The Les Hangars tram stop started service 23 July 2007 on Line B of the tramway de Bordeaux, in Bordeaux, France.

Situation
The station is located on quay Bacalan in Bordeaux.

Close by
 Les Hangars H17, H18 et H19

See also
 TBC
 Tramway de Bordeaux

Bordeaux tramway stops
Tram stops in Bordeaux
Railway stations in France opened in 2007